The 1992–93 Hartford Whalers season was the Whalers' 14th season in the National Hockey League.

Offseason
On May 12, 1992, the Whalers announced that general manager Eddie Johnston would not return to the club after three seasons. During his tenure, the Whalers posted a 95-112-33 record as they qualified for the post-season in each season.

Two weeks later, on May 26, Hartford announced that Brian Burke was hired as the new general manager. Burke had worked with the Vancouver Canucks as the director of hockey operations since the 1987-88 season. As a player, Burke played with the Springfield Indians and Maine Mariners in the American Hockey League from 1976-1978. Burke also played with Providence College from 1973–77, as in 112 games, he scored 21 goals and 38 points. Following his hockey career, Burke attended Harvard Law School, where he graduated with a Juris Doctor in 1981.

On June 13, the club traded away Brad Shaw to the New Jersey Devils for cash considerations. In 62 games with Hartford during the 1991-92 season, Shaw scored three goals and 25 points.

Two days later, on June 15, the Whalers fired head coach Jim Roberts after one season with the club. Roberts led the Whalers to a 26-41-13 record in 1991-92, helping the club reach the post-season. In the playoffs, the Whalers lost to the Montreal Canadiens in a thrilling seven game series. The club announced that Paul Holmgren would take over the head coaching duties from Roberts. Holmgren was the head coach of the Philadelphia Flyers from the 1988-89 season until he was fired 24 games into the 1991-92 season after the club began the season with a record of 8-14-2. In 264 career games, Holmgren posted a record of 107-126-31 record. In the 1988-89, Holmgren led the Flyers to the Wales Conference finals.

On the same day, the club acquired Nick Kypreos from the Washington Capitals in exchange for Tim Hunter and Yvon Corriveau. In 65 games during the 1991-92 season, Kypreos scored four goals and 10 points, while accumulating 206 penalty minutes. The Whalers also acquired Allen Pedersen in a trade with the Minnesota North Stars, in exchange for the Whalers sixth round draft selection in the 1993 NHL Entry Draft. In 29 games during the 1990-91, Pedersen earned an assist.

On June 18, the Whalers lost Peter Sidorkiewicz and Blair Atcheynum to the Ottawa Senators at the 1992 NHL Expansion Draft. Sidorkiewicz posted a 9-19-6 record with a 3.34 GAA and a .882 save percentage with the Whalers in 1991-92, while Atcheynum scored 16 goals and 37 points in 62 games with the Springfield Indians of the AHL during the 1991-92 season.

The Whalers participated in the 1992 NHL Entry Draft held at the Montreal Forum in Montreal, Quebec on June 20. With their first round selection, ninth overall, Hartford selected Róbert Petrovický from Dukla Trencin of the Czechoslovak First Ice Hockey League. In 33 games, Petrovicky scored 17 goals and 42 points with the club. In the second round, with the 47th overall selection, the Whalers selected Andrei Nikolishin from Dynamo Moscow of the Soviet Championship League. In six games, Nikolishin scored a goal during the 1991-92 season. He played a majority of the season with Dynamo Moscow II, where he scored 22 goals and 37 points in 36 games. Other players the Whalers selected in the draft that would play in the NHL include Jan Vopat, Kevin Smyth, Jason McBain, Ken Belanger, and Steven Halko.

On June 29, the Whalers announced that Mikael Andersson would be leaving the club, as he agreed to a contract as a free agent with the Tampa Bay Lightning. Andersson scored 18 goals and 47 points in 74 games with Hartford in 1991-92.

The Whalers announced the signing of free agent Jim Agnew on July 8. Agnew played with the Vancouver Canucks during the 1991-92 season, earning no points and 56 penalty minutes in 24 games.

The same day, on July 8, the Whalers acquired Tim Kerr from the New York Rangers in exchange for a seventh round draft pick in the 1993 NHL Entry Draft. In 32 games with the Rangers in 1991-92, Kerr scored seven goals and 18 points. Kerr played with the Philadelphia Flyers from 1980-1991, scoring 363 goals and 650 points with the team in 601 games. Kerr scored over 50 goals in four consecutive seasons from 1983-1987, including a career high 58 goals in a season in which he achieved twice.

On July 9, the Whalers lost free agent Marc Bergevin as he signed with the Tampa Bay Lightning. In 75 games, Bergevin scored seven goals and 24 points with Hartford during the 1991-92 season.

On August 28, the Whalers were involved in a blockbuster trade with the New Jersey Devils. In the trade, Hartford acquired Sean Burke and Eric Weinrich from the Devils for Bobby Holik and a second round draft pick in the 1993 NHL Entry Draft. Burke sat out the 1991-92 with the Devils, instead playing for the Canadian National Team, winning a silver medal at the 1992 Winter Olympics. In his Devils career that spanned from 1987-1991, Burke played in 162 games, posting a 62-66-23 record with a 3.66 GAA and a .876 save percentage. During the 1991-92 season, Weinrich scored seven goals and 32 points in 76 games with the Devils.

On September 2, Hartford acquired Mark Janssens from the Minnesota North Stars in exchange for James Black. Janssens appeared in seven games with the New York Rangers and North Stars during the 1991-92 season, earning no points. In 55 games with the Binghamton Rangers of the AHL, Janssens scored 10 goals and 33 points during the 1991-92 season. Janssens also appeared in two regular season games with the Kalamazoo Wings of the IHL, earning no points.

The Whalers traded Kay Whitmore to the Vancouver Canucks on October 1, in exchange for Corrie D'Alessio and cash considerations. D'Alessio had a record of 9-14-2 and a 4.01 GAA with the Milwaukee Admirals of the IHL during the 1991-92 season.

Regular season

Although the Whalers finished last in shots on goal during the regular season (2,192), they scored 284 goals to finish with a 13.0 shooting percentage, good enough for 5th in the league (tied with the Vancouver Canucks).

Final standings

Schedule and results

Playoffs
The Whalers missed the playoffs for the first time since 1985.

Player statistics

Regular season
Scoring

Goaltending

Note: GP = Games played; G = Goals; A = Assists; Pts = Points; +/- = Plus-minus PIM = Penalty minutes; PPG = Power-play goals; SHG = Short-handed goals; GWG = Game-winning goals;
      MIN = Minutes played; W = Wins; L = Losses; T = Ties; GA = Goals against; GAA = Goals-against average;  SO = Shutouts; SA=Shots against; SV=Shots saved; SV% = Save percentage;

Awards and records

Transactions
The Whalers were involved in the following transactions during the 1992–93 season.

Trades

Waivers

Free agents

Draft picks
Hartford's draft picks at the 1992 NHL Entry Draft held at the Montreal Forum in Montreal, Quebec.

Farm teams

See also
1992–93 NHL season

References

External links

Hart
Hart
Hartford Whalers seasons
Hart
Hart